Tezozómoc is a metro station on Mexico's Line 6. It is located in the  Azcapotzalco borough. In 2019, the station had an average ridership of 5,757 passengers per day.

General information
The station can be accessed through Ahuehuetes and Avenida Sauces Colonia Pasteros, in the Azcapotzalco borough. It has no underground direct connections, which means that, in order to exchange platforms, one has to exit the station and cross the street, thus making it necessary to pay the fare again, or reach one of the two neighboring stations and change platforms there (without paying extra), a feature only shared with Metro Allende in Line 2.

From 23 April to 16 June 2020, the station was temporarily closed due to the COVID-19 pandemic in Mexico.

Name and pictogram
The station's pictogram depicts King Tezozómoc, who ruled the Azcapotzalco altepetl for 80 years and it is also named in his honor.

Ridership

Exits
North: Ahuehuetes Street and Avenida Sauces, Colonia Pasteros
South: Ahuehuetes Street and Avenida Sauces, Colonia Pasteros

Gallery

References

External links
 

Mexico City Metro Line 6 stations
Railway stations opened in 1983
1983 establishments in Mexico
Mexico City Metro stations in Azcapotzalco